Alexandra Huynh (born 25 July 1994) is an Australian association football player, who currently plays for Western Sydney Wanderers in the Australian A-League Women and the Australia national team. She is the cousin of Kassandra Huynh; the exercise physiologist for the Sydney Wanderers.

Club career

Return to Western Sydney Wanderers
In October 2017, Huynh returned to Western Sydney Wanderers, after playing with Blacktown Spartans.

Second return to Western Sydney Wanderers
In October 2019, Huynh returned to the Australian W-League after playing in the US College system and in the NPL Women's Queensland, and signed with Western Sydney Wanderers.

Napoli
In October 2020, Huynh joined Italian club Napoli, linking up with fellow Australians Isobel Dalton and Jacynta Galabadaarachchi.

Fortuna Hjørring
In July 2021, Huynh joined Danish club Fortuna Hjørring.

Third return to Western Sydney Wanderers
In January 2022, Huynh returned to Australia, signing again with Western Sydney Wanderers until the end of the 2021–22 A-League Women season.

Career statistics

Club

International

References

1994 births
Living people
Australian women's soccer players
Sportswomen from New South Wales
Soccer players from New South Wales
Colorado Buffaloes women's soccer players
Western Sydney Wanderers FC (A-League Women) players
Serie A (women's football) players
Australia women's international soccer players
Expatriate women's soccer players in the United States
A-League Women players
Women's association football defenders
Australian expatriate sportspeople in the United States
Sportspeople of Vietnamese descent
Australian people of Vietnamese descent
Australian twins
Troy Trojans athletes
Expatriate women's footballers in Italy
Australian expatriate sportspeople in Italy
S.S.D. Napoli Femminile players